Pristimantis cryptomelas is a species of frog in the family Strabomantidae.
It is found in the provinces of Morona-Santiago, Zamora-Chinchipe and Loja in Ecuador and the province of Huancabamba in the Piura region in Peru.

It is threatened by habitat loss.

References

cryptomelas
Amphibians of the Andes
Amphibians of Ecuador
Amphibians of Peru
Amphibians described in 1979
Taxonomy articles created by Polbot